Marina Towers project is a residential complex in Beirut Central District, Lebanon. It is located near the Beirut Marina and consists of a high-rise apartment building, Marina Tower, and two mid-rise apartment buildings, Marina Court and Marina Garden. Designed by the renowned firm of architects Kohn Pedersen Fox Associates, the Marina Towers project is built on over 7,000 square metres of land with the main tower reaching a height of 150 metres, making it the second tallest building in Lebanon.

The Marina Towers project is on the Mediterranean Sea. The project consists of three distinct elements, the Marina Tower, the Marina Garden, and the Marina Court; covering over 2000 square metres of land.

The Tower 
The orientation of the Marina Tower is set on the radial axis of the harbor, emphasizing its vital link with the Beirut Western Marina.

A crescent shape has been used in the design of the structure to incorporate the naturally rounded forms of waterfront architecture and provide each of the apartments with dramatic panoramas to the sea, the mountains, the Beirut Central District Park and the Marina. The contemplative, clean-lined architecture consists of 26 floors that stretch 150m above sea level. The entire structure uses stone and glass with a combination of aluminum curtain walls and clear double-glazing that extends all the way to the top.

Residents with boats can use a nearby floating slip that gives access to the sea.

The Garden 
Directly adjacent to the Marina Tower is the Marina Garden, an area offering the choice of smaller, units that are surrounded by over 3,000 square metres of gardens.

The Court 
As a complement to the Tower and Garden, the Court offers space with smaller, more adaptable, modular surface areas that allow for a possible expansion by joining apartments.

Each apartment has  ceilings, glass walls, and trendy space management, intended to make the most of each square meter.

See also 
Ministry of Tourism
Tourism in Lebanon
Beirut Central District

External links 
 Marina Towers on Emporis
 Marina Tower on Phorio

Buildings and structures in Beirut
Kohn Pedersen Fox buildings